Banner Elk is a town in Avery County, North Carolina, United States. The population was 1,028 at the 2010 census. Banner Elk is home to Lees–McRae College.

History
The area surrounding the Elk River was inhabited by the Cherokee before western settlement, although no evidence of a permanent Cherokee settlement has ever been found. It is likely the area was used for hunting and fishing. The first permanent settlement was established by Martin L. Banner in 1848. Although the Banner family originally came from Wales, Martin Banner moved from Forsyth County in the Piedmont region of North Carolina. Eventually, the Banner family grew to 55 members, and the area where they lived became known as Banner's Elk. This name was later shortened to Banner Elk when the town was incorporated in 1911.

The Banner Elk Hotel and Robert Chester and Elsie H. Lowe House are listed on the National Register of Historic Places.

Demographics

2020 census

As of the 2020 United States census, there were 1,049 people, 277 households, and 147 families residing in the town.

2000 census
As of the census of 2000, there were 811 people, 215 households, and 124 families residing in the town. The population density was 679.8 people per square mile (263.1/km2). There were 290 housing units at an average density of 243.1 per square mile (94.1/km2). The racial makeup of the town was 90.26% White, 3.95% African American, 0.62% Native American, 1.23% Asian, 0.25% Pacific Islander, 1.23% from other races, and 2.47% from two or more races. Hispanic or Latino of any race were 1.85% of the population.

Of the 215 households, 23.3% had children under the age of 18 living with them, 46.5% were married couples living together, 8.4% had a female householder with no husband present, and 42.3% were non-families. 30.2% of all households were made up of individuals, and 8.8% had someone living alone who was 65 years of age or older. The average household size was 2.13 and the average family size was 2.65.

In the town, the population was spread out, with 10.7% under the age of 18, 47.8% from 18 to 24, 16.8% from 25 to 44, 14.9% from 45 to 64, and 9.7% who were 65 years of age or older. The median age was 22 years. For every 100 females, there were 93.1 males

Geography
Banner Elk is located at  (36.159561, −81.871649).

Climate
Banner Elk is located in North America's humid continental climate zone due to its elevation, which gives it a climate more like that of Altoona, Pennsylvania, than Asheville, North Carolina, during the winter. During the summer the temperatures are much like a mountain lake town in New Hampshire. The town typically has cold, snowy winters and mild summers.

Attractions
During summertime there is hiking, whitewater rafting, fishing, and other activities. The largest lake in the area, Watauga Lake, is a favorite spot just 30 minutes away for boating, fishing and wake boarding. In the winter the main activities are skiing and snowboarding. There are two slopes in the area: Beech Mountain and Sugar Mountain. There was formerly a third, but in the winter of 2008-2009, Hawks' Nest became an all-tubing park, the largest in the Eastern United States.

There are several restaurants in Banner Elk in addition to a post office, bank, and many lodging choices. The town has hosted the Woolly Worm festival over the third weekend of October since 1978.

In the 1970s, Beech Mountain was home to a theme park based on The Wizard of Oz, called The Land of Oz, but it closed after 10 years. The attraction was never fully removed, and there have been various attempts to revive it.

Education

Lees–McRae College is a private four-year college in Banner Elk.  Banner Elk has a K-5th school, run by the Avery County School system.

Photo gallery

See also
 Beech Mountain (North Carolina)
 Elizabethton, Tennessee
 Elk River (North Carolina)
 Roan Mountain, Tennessee
 Shawneehaw Creek
 Sugar Mountain (North Carolina)
 Watauga River

References

External links
 Town of Banner Elk official website
 Avery Banner Elk Chamber of Commerce

Towns in North Carolina
Towns in Avery County, North Carolina
Populated places established in 1848